Alma's Rainbow is American coming-of-age film directed by Ayoka Chenzira originally released in 1994. A restoration of the film, presented by Julie Dash, was released to theaters and streaming in 2022. The film received positive reviews from critics and was included in Slate's 2023 list of the 75 greatest movies by Black directors.

Release and restoration 
The 35 mm feature film was self-funded by Chenzira and originally debuted in 1994, but did not receive widespread distribution. In 2022, the film was restored in 4K resolution by the Academy Film Archive, Film Foundation, and Milestone Films and had a theatrical run.

Critical reception 
On the review aggregation website Rotten Tomatoes, the film holds an approval rating of 79% with an average rating of 6 out of 10, based on 14 reviews.

References